Jules Gildas Youmeni Deugoue (born 29 June 1998) is a Cameroonian professional footballer who most recently played for CD Calahorra B in the Tercera División RFEF.

Career

Orlando City B 
Youmeni signed with United Soccer League side Orlando City B on 9 February 2017. He made his professional debut on 15 April 2017 against New York Red Bulls II.

CD Sariñena
On 5 November 2019, Youmeni signed with Spanish club CD Sariñena who play in Segunda División B, the third-division of Spanish soccer.

Roskilde
At the end of July 2019 it was confirmed, that Youmeni had joined Danish 1st Division club FC Roskilde. However, the deal wasn't confirmed before the 3 September 2019, where he got his work permit and could sign a two-year deal. He made his debut for the club on the same day in the Danish Cup. On 10 January 2020 it was confirmed, that he had left the club after making only the one cup appearance.

Ringkøbing
On 24 January 2020, Youmeni signed a six-month contract with Ringkøbing IF in the Danish 2nd Division. Following his move, he stated that he looked forward to develop as a player and help save the club from relegation.

Calahorra
Youmeni returned to Spain in September 2020, joining the B-team of CD Calahorra in the Tercera División.

References

External links
 
 

1998 births
Living people
Cameroonian footballers
Cameroonian expatriate footballers
Orlando City B players
CD Sariñena players
FC Roskilde players
Ringkøbing IF players
CD Calahorra players
USL Championship players
Tercera Federación players
Danish 2nd Division players
Association football defenders
Cameroonian expatriate sportspeople in the United States
Cameroonian expatriate sportspeople in Spain
Cameroonian expatriate sportspeople in Denmark
Expatriate soccer players in the United States
Expatriate footballers in Spain
Expatriate men's footballers in Denmark
Montverde Academy alumni